Hinterstockensee is a lake above Erlenbach im Simmental in the Canton of Berne, Switzerland. The lake is located at an elevation of 1595 m, below Stockhorn (2190 m) and near Oberstockensee (1665 m).

In the lake is a  island.

See also
List of mountain lakes of Switzerland

References
Swisstopo topographic maps

Hinterstocken
Lakes of the canton of Bern